The South East Busway is a grade separated bus-only road running south from the Brisbane central business district to Eight Mile Plains in Queensland, Australia. The busway was completed to Woolloongabba in September 2000 and to Eight Mile Plains in April 2001. An extension of the busway to School Road at Rochedale was completed in 2014 with no additional busway stations.  The maximum capacity of the busway is 18,000 commuters an hour during peak periods. The busway carries an estimated 70 million passengers annually.

The busway allows services to branch off along any part to service nearby suburbs. This has been described as the Quickway model of bus rapid transit.

History
Busways were considered as one of the options when the Queensland Government developed the 25 year Integrated Regional Transport Plan. Other methods such as light and heavy rail were also considered. It was recommended that a  network of busway corridors to complement the existing Queensland Rail City network would suit best.

Busways would allow buses to serve low-density communities and bypass peak hour congestion. Busway stations could be developed at key nodes to serve major activity centres, and combining different routes would create high frequency services.

In 1995, plans for a network of five busway corridors were conceived, linking with the rail network to improve public transport connectivity across the city. The busways would improve the operation of the bus fleet, reducing maintenance and running costs and maximising the effectiveness of the region's investment in buses.

In August 1996, the Queensland Government approved the South East Transit Project to manage the construction of both the northern section of the Pacific Motorway between Mount Gravatt and Logan City and a dedicated 2-lane, 2-way road for buses between the Brisbane CBD and Eight Mile Plains.

The first section of busway between the existing Queen Street bus station and Woolloongabba was opened to services on 13 September 2000 to coincide with the start of the 2000 Olympic football tournament, for which some matches were held in Brisbane. It initially opened for outbound services only, with inbound services commencing on 23 October 2000. The second  section of busway between Woolloongabba and Eight Mile Plains opened on 30 April 2001.

Extension to Springwood
The extension of the South East Busway from Eight Mile Plains Busway Station to Rochedale Busway Station was proposed in July 2006 as part of the Queensland Government's Pacific Motorway Transit Project. As part of the project, plans were made to extend the South East Busway as far as Springwood bus station, including construction of the proposed Rochedale busway station. The preferred alignment for the busway extension corridor was determined in 2007 and a Concept Design Study was undertaken by the Queensland Government in 2009.

Construction of the Eight Mile Plains to Rochedale extension to the Busway commenced in late 2012 and was completed in March 2014. The extension had an estimated cost of $36 million. The extension was funded by the Queensland Government ($36m) and formed part of the Federal Government's Gateway Upgrade South (GUS) project. The busway extension passes under the Gateway Motorway and terminates at School Road, Rochedale. Whilst the busway alignment plan published in 2010 anticipated a Busway Station at Rochedale, no new busway stations were added by this extension. The proposed location of the Rochedale busway station is further south than the end of the current extension works

As part of the upgrade of the Pacific Motorway between Eight Mile Plains and Daisy Hill commenced in 2020, the Busway will be extended to Springwood, with a new Rochedale busway station to be constructed. The Pacific Highway upgrade and the Busway extension is expected to be completed in 2024.

Route

The busway commences at Queen Street bus station beneath the Brisbane central business district, crossing the Brisbane River via Victoria Bridge to the Cultural Centre busway station, then paralleling the rail lines to South Bank railway station before passing beneath under Stanley Street. It then runs parallel to the Pacific Motorway to Eight Mile Plains.

Services
Brisbane Transport and Clarks Logan City Bus Service operate services along the full length of the busway while Mt Gravatt Bus Service and Transdev Queensland operate services between Griffith University and Eight Mile Plains.

Passenger information
Real Time Passenger Information is displayed at each station, with fixed LED signs suspended above each platform. These signs present four lines of real-time estimated bus departure times, with data provided by Brisbane City Council's RAPID system.

See also

Transport in Brisbane

References

External links

Bus rapid transit in Australia
Busways
Public transport in Brisbane
Transport infrastructure completed in 2001
2000 establishments in Australia